Pardosa moesta is a species of wolf spider in the family Lycosidae. It is found in the United States and Canada.

References

moesta
Articles created by Qbugbot
Spiders described in 1892